Union Church may refer to:

Churches

Greek Catholic Church

Australia
Union Church (Australia), a building maintained by a local trust and available to multiple denominations

China
Union Church, Hong Kong
Union Church (Shanghai)

Dominican Republic
Union Church of Santo Domingo

United States
(by state then city)
 Union Church and School (Paris, Arkansas), listed  on the National Register of Historic Places (NRHP)
 Union Church of Dunnigan, California, listed on the NRHP
 Sterling Union Pacific Railroad Depot, Sterling, Colorado, listed on the NRHP in Colorado
 Union Church/St. Paul's Church, Riverton, Connecticut, listed on the NRHP
 Jensen Union Church, Jensen Beach, Florida, now Jensen Beach Christian Church
 Makawao Union Church, Paia, Hawaii, listed on the NRHP
 Union Church (Oreana, Illinois), listed on the NRHP
 Old Union Church and Cemetery (Alfordsville, Indiana), listed on the NRHP in Indiana
 Union Church (Davis City, Iowa), listed on the NRHP
 Union Church (Sibley, Louisiana), listed on the NRHP
 Union Church (Buckfield, Maine), listed on the NRHP
 Union Church (Columbia Falls, Maine), listed on the NRHP
 Union Church (Durham, Maine), listed on the NRHP
 Columbia Union Church, Epping, Maine, listed on the NRHP
 Jonesboro Union Church, Jonesboro, Maine, listed on the NRHP
 Union Church (Naples, Maine), listed on the NRHP
 Union Church (North Harpswell, Maine), listed on the NRHP
 Union Church of Northeast Harbor, Maine, listed on the NRHP
 Union Church (Phillips, Maine), listed on the NRHP
 Union Church (Round Pond, Maine), listed on the NRHP
 Stetson Union Church, Stetson, Maine, listed on the NRHP
 Union Church of Vinalhaven, Maine, listed on the NRHP
 South Swansea Union Church, now South Swansea Baptist Church, Swansea, Massachusetts, listed on the NRHP
 Greenwood Union Church, Wakefield, Massachusetts, listed on the NRHP
 South Berrien Center Union Church and Cemetery, Berrien, Michigan, listed on the NRHP
 Sherman City Union Church, Sherman City, Michigan, listed on the NRHP
 People's Union Church, Scambler Township, Minnesota, listed on the NRHP
 Union Church Presbyterian Church (Union Church, Mississippi), listed on the NRHP in Mississippi
 Northfield Union Church, Northfield, New Hampshire, listed on the NRHP
 Union Church (South Wolfeboro, New Hampshire), listed on the NRHP
 Stark Union Church, Stark, New Hampshire, listed on the NRHP
 First Union Protestant Church of Mountain View, Bellmont, New York, listed on the NRHP
 Foothills Baptist Church (Essex, New York), formerly known as Union Church at Boquet Chapel, listed on the NRHP
 Hamilton Union Church Rectory, Guilderland, New York, listed on the NRHP
 Union Church of Pocantico Hills, Pocantico Hills, New York, listed on the NRHP
 Stone Mills Union Church, Stone Mills, New York, listed on the NRHP
 Grace Union Church and Cemetery, Blackburn, North Carolina, listed on the NRHP
 Salem Union Church and Cemetery, Maiden, North Carolina, listed on the NRHP
 Berea Union Depot, Berea, Ohio, listed on the NRHP
 Union Church (Kipton, Ohio), listed on the NRHP
 Bellman's Union Church, Centerport, Pennsylvania, listed on the NRHP in Pennsylvania
 Chestnut Ridge and Schellsburg Union Church and Cemetery, Napier Township, Pennsylvania, listed on the NRHP
 Union Church and Burial Ground, Philipsburg, Pennsylvania, listed on the NRHP
 St. Paul's Union Church and Cemetery, Ringtown, Pennsylvania, listed on the NRHP
 Union Church (Portsmouth, Rhode Island), listed on the NRHP
 Highland Chapel Union Church, Ridgetop, Tennessee, listed on the NRHP
 Big Spring Union Church, Springdale, Tennessee, listed on the NRHP
 Fletcher Union Church, Fletcher, Vermont, listed on the NRHP
 Union Church (New Haven, Vermont), listed on the NRHP
 Beaver Meadow Union Chapel, Norwich, Vermont, listed on the NRHP
 Earlysville Union Church, Earlysville, Virginia, listed on the NRHP

Places
United States
Union Church, Alabama
Union Church, Mississippi
Union Church, Wisconsin

See also
Union Baptist Church (disambiguation)
Union Cemetery (disambiguation)
Union Chapel (disambiguation)
Union Congregational Church (disambiguation)
Union Episcopal Church (disambiguation)
Union Meetinghouse (disambiguation)
Union Presbyterian Church (disambiguation)